Hungarian prehistory spans the period of history of the Hungarian people, or Magyars, which started with the separation of the Hungarian language from other Finno-Ugric or Ugric languages around , and ended with the Hungarian conquest of the Carpathian Basin around . Based on the earliest records of the Magyars in Byzantine, Western European, and Hungarian chronicles, scholars considered them for centuries to have been the descendants of the ancient Scythians and Huns. This historiographical tradition disappeared from mainstream history after the realization of similarities between the Hungarian language and the Uralic languages in the late . Thereafter, linguistics became the principal source of the study of the Hungarians' ethnogenesis.

They spread over vast territories, which caused the development of a separate Proto-Finno-Ugric language by the end of the millennium. Linguistic studies and archaeological research evidence that those who spoke this language lived in pit-houses and used decorated clay vessels. The expansion of marshlands after around  caused new migrations. They lived in settled communities, cultivated millet, wheat, and other crops, and bred animalsespecially horses, cattle, and pigs. Loan words connected to animal husbandry from Proto-Iranian show that they had close contacts with their neighbors.

The history of the ancient Magyars during the next thousand years is uncertain; they lived in the steppes but the location of their Urheimat is subject to scholarly debates. Hundreds of loan words adopted from Chuvash-type Turkic languages prove the Magyars were closely connected to Turkic peoples.

An alliance between the Magyars and the Bulgarians in the late 830s was the first historical event that was recorded with certainty in connection with the Magyars. According to the Byzantine Emperor Constantine VII Porphyrogenitus, the Magyars lived in Levedia in the vicinity of the Khazar Khaganate in the early  and supported the Khazars in their wars "for three years". The Magyars were organized into tribes, each headed by their own "voivodes", or military leaders. After a Pecheneg invasion against Levedia, a group of Magyars crossed the Caucasus Mountains and settled in the lands south of the mountains, but the majority of the people fled to the steppes north of the Black Sea. From their new homeland, which was known as Etelköz, the Magyars controlled the lands between the Lower Danube and the Don River in the 870s. The confederation of their seven tribes was led by two supreme chiefs, the kende and the gyula. The Kabarsa group of rebellious subjects of the Khazarsjoined the Magyars in Etelköz. The Magyars regularly invaded the neighboring Slavic tribes, forcing them to pay a tribute and seizing prisoners to be sold to the Byzantines. Taking advantage of the wars between Bulgaria, East Francia, and Moravia, they invaded Central Europe at least four times between 861 and 894. A new Pecheneg invasion compelled the Magyars to leave Etelköz, cross the Carpathian Mountains, and settle in the Carpathian Basin around 895.

Ethnonyms 

The Hungarians were mentioned under various ethnic names in Arabic, Byzantine, Slavic, and Western European sources in the 9th and 10th centuries. Arabic scholars referred to them as Magyars, Bashkirs, or Turks; Byzantine authors mentioned them as Huns, Ungrs, Turks, or Savards; Slavic sources used the ethnonyms Ugr or Peon, and Western European authors wrote of Hungrs, Pannons, Avars, Huns, Turks, and Agaren. According to the linguist Gyula Németh, the multiple ethnonymsespecially Ungr, Savard, and Turkreflect that the Magyars had been integrated in various empires of the Eurasian steppesthe tribal confederations of the Onogurs and of the Sabirs, and the Göktürksbefore gaining their independence. The designation Bashkirs likely comes from proximity to the Turkic-speaking Bashkirs, a group which still today remains in the southern Urals.

Ibn Rusta was the first to record a variant of the Hungarians' self-designation; (al-Madjghariyya). According to a scholarly theory, the ethnonym "Magyar" is a composite word. The first part of the word (magy-) is said to have been connected to several recorded or hypothetical words, including the Mansi's self-designation (māńśi) and a reconstructed Ugric word for man (*mańća). The second part (-er or -ar) may have developed from a reconstructed Finno-Ugrian word for man or boy (*irkä) or from a Turkic word with a similar meaning (eri or iri). Alan W. Ertl writes that the ethnonym was initially the name of a smaller group, the Megyer tribe; it developed into an ethnonym because Megyer was the most powerful tribe within the people. Most scholars agree that the Hungarian exonym and its variants were derived from the Onogurs' name. This form started spreading in Europe with Slavic mediation.

Formation of the Magyar people

Before the separation of the Hungarian language (before  800 BC) 

Hungarian has traditionally been classified as an Ugric language within the family of Uralic languages, but alternative views exist. For instance, linguist Tapani Salminen rejects the existence of a Proto-Ugric language, saying Hungarian was a member of an "areal genetic unit" that also included Permic languages. Paleolinguistic research suggests the speakers of the Proto-Uralic language lived in a territory where four treeslarch, silver fir, spruce, and elmgrew together. The land between the Urals and the Kama was sparsely inhabited during this period. Regional variants emerged, showing the appearance of groups of people who had no close contact with each other.

About 1000 basic words of the Hungarian languageincluding the names of the seasons and natural phenomena, and the most frequently used verbshad cognates in other Finno-Ugric languages, suggesting the temporary existence of a Proto-Finno-Ugric language. Whether the groups speaking the language from which Hungarian emerged lived to the east or to the west of the Urals in this period is debated by historians.

Around , the climate again changed with the beginning of a wetter period, forcing the nomadic Ugric groups to start a southward migration, following the grasslands. Their movement separated them from the northern Ugric groups, which gave rise to the development of the language from which modern Hungarian emerged. According to historian László Kontler, the concept of the "sky-high tree" and some other elements of Hungarian folklore seem to have been inherited from the period of the Finno-Ugric unity. The melodies of the most common Hungarian funeral songs show similarities to tunes of Khanty epic songs.

Original homeland ( 800 BCbefore 600 AD) 

The stag and the eagle, which are popular motifs of 10th-century Magyar art, have close analogies in Scythian art. During this period, all ethnic groups in the steppes were nomads with almost identical material cultures, for which the certain identification of the Magyars is impossible. Consequently, the exact location of their original homeland is subject to scholarly debates. Róna-Tas says the development of Hungarian started in the region of the rivers Kama and Volga, west of the Urals. Archaeologist István Fodor writes that the original homeland lay to the east of the Urals.

Migrations

Early westward migrations (before 600 AD 750 or 830 AD) 

In the 1230s, Friar Julian went to search for the Magyars' legendary homeland Magna Hungaria after reading about it and a group of Magyars who had remained there in a Hungarian chronicle. He met a Hungarian-speaking group "beside the great Etil river" (the Volga or the Kama) in the land of the Volga Bulgars, in or in the wider region of present-day Bashkortostan in Eastern Europe. Whether Magna Hungaria was the original homeland of the Magyars, or whether the Magyars' ancestors settled in Magna Hungaria after their migration to Europe from their Western Siberian original homeland is still subject to scholarly debates. According to a third scholarly theory, Magna Hungaria was neither the Magyars' original homeland nor their first homeland in Europe. Instead, the ancestors of the Eastern Magyars whom Friar Julian met had moved to Magna Hungaria from the south.

According to a scholarly theory, the name of at least one Magyar tribe, Gyarmat, is connected to the name of a Bashkir group, Yurmatï. Most specialists say that the cemetery at Bolshie Tigany was used by Magyars who either remained in Magna Hungaria when other Magyar groups left the territory, or who moved there from other regions which were inhabited by the Magyars during their migrations.

If the Magyars' original homeland was situated in Western Siberia, instead of being identical with Magna Hungaria, their ancestors moved from Western Siberia to Eastern Europe. The Avars' attack against the Sabirs in Siberia set in motion a number of migrations in the 460s. Between around 550 and 600, the migration of the Avars towards Europe compelled many nomadic groups to move.

The arrival of the Huns ended the dominance of Iranian peoples in the Eurasian steppes. Thereafter the Sabirs, Avars, Onoghurs, Khazars, and other Turkic peoples controlled the grasslands of Eastern Europe for centuries. Gardizi described the Magyars as "a branch of the Turks"; Leo the Wise and Constantine Porphyrogenitus called them Turks. About 450 Hungarian words were borrowed from Turkic languages before around 900. The oldest layer of Hungarian folk songs show similarities to Chuvash songs. These facts show the Magyars were closely connected to the Turks while they stayed in the Pontic steppes.

Gyula Németh, András Róna-Tas and other scholars write that for centuries, the Magyars lived around the Kuban River, to the north of the Caucasus Mountains. They say it was there that the Magyars adopted the Turkic terminology of viticulture, including bor ("wine") and seprő ("dregs"), and the Turkic names of cornel (som), grapes (szőlő) and some other fruits. According to these scholars, the Hungarian words of Alanic originincluding asszony ("lady", originally "noble or royal lady")were also borrowed in the same region.

Levedia ( 750 or 830 850)

The Khazar Khaganate was the dominant power in the steppes between the rivers Dnieper and Volga after around 650. Archaeological finds show that the Khagans controlled a multi-ethnic empire. The "Saltovo-Mayaki culture", which flourished in the same region around 750 and 900, had at least seven variants. In the Hungarian chronicles, the legend of the wondrous hind seems to have preserved the memory of the Magyars' "close symbiosis, intermarriages, and incipient fusion" with various ethnic groupsAlans, Bulgars, and Onogursof this large region.

Emperor Constantine Porphyrogenitus wrote that the Magyars "had of old their dwelling next to Chazaria, in the place called Levedia," adding that "a river Chidmas, also called Chingilous" ran through this territory. The identification of the (one or two) rivers is uncertain. Porphyrogenitus associated Levedia with the whole territory dominated by the Magyars, but most modern historians agree that he only described a smaller region situated on the Don River. The period when the Magyars settled in Levedia is also uncertain; this happened either before 750 (István Fodor) or around 830 (Gyula Kristó). Porphyrogenitus said that the Magyars had been named "Sabartoi asphaloi", or "steadfast Savarts", while staying in Levedia. Róna-Tas says the ethnonym is an invented term with no historical credibility. Based on the same denomination, Károly Czeglédy, Dezső Dümmerth, Victor Spinei, and other historians associated the Magyars either with the late 6th-century Sabirs or with the Suvar tribe of the Volga Bulgars.

Porphyroneitus wrote that the Magyars "lived together with the Chazars for three years, and fought in alliance with the Chazars in all their wars", which suggests that the Magyars were subjugated to the Khazar Khagan, according to a scholarly view. On the other hand, historian György Szabados says, the emperor's words prove the equal position of the Magyars and the Khazars, instead of the Magyars' subjugation to the Khagan. Although the emperor said that the Magyars' cohabitation with the Khazars lasted only for three years, modern historians tend to propose a longer period (20, 30, 100, 150, 200 or even 300 years).

According to a memorial stone erected in or before 831, a Bulgarian military commander named Okorsis drowned in the Dnieper during a military campaign. Florin Curta says this inscription may be the first clue' to the upheaval on the steppes created by the migration of the Magyars into the lands between the Dnieper and the Danube". The earliest certainly identifiable events of the Magyars' history occurred in the 830s. The Bulgarians hired them to fight against their Byzantine prisoners, who rebelled and tried to return to Macedonia in the late 830s, but the Byzantines routed them on the banks on the Lower Danube. According to the Annals of St. Bertin, Rus' envoys who visited Constantinople in 839 could only return to their homeland through the Carolingian Empire because "the route by which they had reached Constantinople had taken them through primitive tribes that were very fierce and savage"; Curta and Kristó identify those tribes with the Magyars. Ibn Rusta wrote that the Khazars "used to be protected from attack by the Magyars and other neighboring peoples" by a ditch. According to a scholarly theory, Ibn Rusta's report shows that the Khazar fort at Sarkel, which was built in the 830s, was one of the forts protecting the Khazars against the Magyars.

According to Porphyrogenitus, In Levedia, the Magyars "were seven clans, but they had never had over them a prince either native or foreign, but there were among them 'voivodes, or chiefs. Although the exact meaning of the term the emperor used (genea) cannot be exactly determined, scholars have traditionally considered the Magyar "clans" or "tribes" as ethnic and territorial units. In the Hungarian chronicles, references to "seven leading persons" or "seven captains" denote the existence of seven Magyar tribes.

Porphyrogenitus said the tribes did not "obey their own particular [voivodes], but [had] a joint agreement to fight together with all earnestness and  wheresoever war breaks out", suggesting the tribal chiefs were military rather than political leaders. According to Kristó, the emperor's report also shows the tribal confederation was not a "solid political formation with strong cohesion" in the early 9th century. The Gesta Hungarorum referred to the seven Magyar chiefs as "Hetumoger", or "Seven Magyars". Similar ethnonymsincluding Toquz Oghuz ("Nine Oghuzes") and Onogur ("Ten Ogurs")suggest the Gesta preserved the name of the confederation of the Magyar tribes. According to Porphyrogenitus, Levedia was named after Levedi, one of the Magyar voivodes. During Levedi's life, the Kangars, a distinct group within the Pechenegs' tribal confederation whom the Khazars had expelled from their homeland, invaded Levedia and forced the Magyars to cede the territory. A Magyar group fled across the Caucasus Mountains as far as Persia. However, the masses departed for the West and settled in a region called Etelköz. Most historians agree the Magyars' forced exodus from Levedia occurred around 850.

Etelköz ( 850 895)

Constantine Porphyrogenitus identified Etelköz with the lands where the rivers "Barouch", "Koubou", "Troullos", "Broutos", and "Seretos" run. The identification of the last three rivers with the Dniester, the Prut, and the Siret is without debate, but the traditional identification of the Barouch with the Dnieper and the Koubou with the Southern Bug is refuted by Spinei. Al-Jayhani wrote that the Magyars' territory was located between two rivers named "tl" and "dwb" in the 870s. According to modern scholars, tl may refer to the Volga, the Don, or the Dnieper; dwb is identified as the Danube. According to the Gesta Hungarorum, the Magyars lived in "Scythia" or "Dentumoger"; the latter name, which refers to the Don River, suggests the Magyars inhabited the eastern regions of the Pontic steppes, according to Spinei. János Harmatta infers that Dentu (reconstructed as Dentü) was the Proto-Hungarian name of the river.

The Khazar Khagan sent his envoys to the Magyars shortly after they fled from Levedia and settled in Etelköz, according to Porphyrogenitus. The Khagan invited Levedi to a meeting, proposing to make Levedi the supreme head of the confederation of the Magyar tribes in exchange for the acceptance of his suzerainty. Instead of accepting the offer, Levedi suggested the new rank should be offered to another voivode, Álmos, or the latter's son, Árpád. The Khagan accepted Levedi's proposal and upon his demand the Magyar chiefs proclaimed Árpád their head. According to Kristó and Spinei, Porphyrogenitus' report preserved the memory of the creation of a central office within the federation of the Magyar tribes. Róna-Tas says the story relates only a "change of dynasty"; the fall of Levedi's family and the emergence of the Árpád dynasty. In contrast with Porphyrogenitus's story, the Gesta Hungarorum says it was not Árpád, but his father who was elected the first supreme prince of the Magyars.

According to Muslim scholars, the Magyars had two supreme leaders, the kende and the gyula, the latter being their ruler in the 870s. Their report implies the Khagan granted a Khazar title to the head of the federation of the Magyar tribes; Ibn Fadlan recorded that the third Khazar dignitary was styled kündür in the 920s. The Muslim scholar's report also implies the Magyars adopted the Khazar system of "dual kingship", whereby supreme power was divided between a sacred ruler (the kende) and a military leader (the gyula).

Porphyrogenitus wrote that the Kabarsa group of Khazars who rebelled against the Khaganjoined the Magyars in Etelköz at an unspecified time, suggesting that the Magyars had got rid of the Khagan's suzerainty. The Kabars were organized into three tribes, but a single chieftain commanded them. Porphyrogenitus also wrote that the Kabars "were promoted to be first" tribe, because they showed themselves "the strongest and most valorous" of the tribes. Accordingly, the Kabars formed the Magyars' vanguard, because nomadic peoples always placed the associated tribes in the most vulnerable position.

Ibn Rusta wrote that the Magyars subjected the neighboring Slavic peoples, imposing "a heavy tribute on them" and treating them as prisoners. The Magyars also "made piratical raids on the Slavs" and sold those captured during these raids to the Byzantines in Kerch on the Crimean peninsula. A band of Magyar warriors attacked the future Saint Cyril the Philosopher "howling like wolves and wishing to kill him" in the steppes near the Crimea, according to the saint's legend. However, Cyril convinced them to "release him and his entire retinue in peace". The inhabitants of the regions along the left bank of the Dniesterwhom the Russian Primary Chronicle identified as Tivertsifortified their settlements in the second half of the 9th century, which seems to be connected to the Magyars' presence.

A plundering raid in East Francia in 862 was the Magyars' first recorded military expedition in Central Europe. This raid may have been initiated by Rastislav of Moravia, who was at war with Louis the German, according to Róna-Tas and Spinei. The longer version of the Annals of Salzburg said the Magyars returned to East Francia and ransacked the region of Vienna in 881. The same source separately mentioned the Cowari, or Kabars, plundering the region of Kulmberg or Kollmitz in the same year, showing that the Kabars formed a distinct group. In the early 880s, a "king" of the Magyars had an amicable meeting with Methodius, Archbishop of Moravia, who was returning from Constantinople to Moravia, according to Methodius' legend.

The Hungarian Conquest ( 895907)

The Magyars returned to Central Europe in July 892, when they invaded Moravia in alliance with Arnulf, king of East Francia. Two years later, they stormed into the March of Pannonia. According to the Annals of Fulda, they "killed men and old women outright, and carried out the young women along with them like cattle to satisfy their lusts". Although this source does not refer to an alliance between the Magyars and Svatopluk I of Moravia, most historians agree the Moravian ruler persuaded them to invade East Francia. During their raids in the Carpathian Basin, the Magyars had several opportunities to collect information on their future homeland.

The Samanid emir, Isma'il ibn Ahmad, launched an expedition against the Oghuz Turks in 893, forcing them to invade the Pechenegs' lands between the Volga and Ural rivers. After being expelled from their homeland, the Pechenegs departed for the west in search of new pastures. The Magyars had in the meantime invaded Bulgaria in alliance with the Byzantine Emperor Leo the Wise. Simeon I of Bulgaria sent envoys to the Pechenegs and persuaded them to storm into Etelköz. The unexpected invasion destroyed the unguarded dwelling places of the Magyars, forcing them to leave the Pontic steppes and seek refuge over the Carpathian Mountains. The Magyars occupied their new homeland in several phases, initially settling the lands east of the Danube and only invading the March of Pannonia after Arnulf of East Francia died in 899. They destroyed Moravia before 906 and consolidated their control of the Carpathian Basin through their victory over a Bavarian army in the Battle of Brezalauspurc in 907.

Sources

Archaeology 

Since the 1830s, archaeology has played an important role in the study of the Magyar prehistory. Archaeologists have applied two methods; the so-called "linear method" attempts to determine the route of the migrating Magyars from their original homeland to the Carpathian Basin, while the "retrospective method" tries to discover the antecedents of 10th-century assemblages from the Carpathian Basin in the Eurasian steppes. However, only twelve cemeteries in the steppes have yielded finds that show similarities to assemblages unearthed in the Carpathian Basin. The dating of those cemeteries is also controversial.

Both the scarcity of published archaeological material and the misdating of some sites may have contributed to the low number of archaeological sites that can be attributed to the Hungarians in the steppes, according to archaeologist László Kovács. Kovács also says that the Hungarians' migration from the steppes and their settlement in the Carpathian Basin may have caused the development of a new material culture, rendering the identification of pre-conquest Hungarians difficult. Archaeological research has demonstrated that the material culture of the Avars and other steppe peoples who settled in the Carpathian Basin before the Hungarians experienced a similarly significant change after they left the steppes and settled in their new homeland.

Buckles, belt mounts, and other objects of the so-called "Subotcy horizon", which were unearthed at Caterinovca, Slobozia, and other sites along the middle course of the Dniester show similarities with archaeological finds from the 10th-century Carpathian Basin. These objects were carbon dated to the late . The same archaeological sites also yielded vessels similar to the pottery of the neighboring Slavic territories.

Linguistics 

The study of the Hungarian language is one of the main sources of the research on the ethnogenesis of the Hungarian people because a language shows the circumstances of its own development and its contacts with other idioms. According to a scholarly theory, the oldest layers of Hungarian vocabulary show features of the territory in which the language emerged. The study of loan words from other languages is instrumental in determining direct contacts between the ancient speakers of the Hungarian language and other peoples. Loan words also reflect changes in the way of life of the Magyars.

Written sources 

Written sources on the prehistoric Hungarians may begin with Herodotus, who wrote of the Iyrcae, a people of equestrian hunters who lived next to the Thyssagetae. Based on the location of the homeland of the Iyrcae and their ethnonym, Gyula Moravcsik, János Harmatta, and other scholars identify them as Hungarians; their view has not been universally accepted. Moravcsik, Dezső Pais, and other historians connect Muageris's name to the Hungarians' endonym (Magyar); they say Malalas's report proves the presence of Magyar tribes in the region of the Sea of Azov in the early . This identification is rejected by most scholars.

The Byzantine Emperor Leo the Wise's Tactics, a book written around 904, contained a detailed description of their military strategies and way of life. Emperor Constantine Porphyrogenitus's De administrando imperio ("On Governing the Empire"), which was completed between 948 and 952, preserves most information on the Magyars' early history. Abu Abdallah al-Jayhani, the minister of Nasr II, ruler of the Samanid Empire, collected the reports of merchants who had traveled in the western regions of the Eurasian steppes in the 870s and 880s. Although Al-Jayhani's work was lost, later Muslim scholars Ibn Rusta, Gardizi, Abu Tahir Marwazi, and Al-Bakri used his book, preserving important facts about the late 9th-century Magyars. However, their works also contain interpolations from later periods. Among the sources written in Western Europe, the longer version of the Annals of Salzburg, Regino of Prüm's Chronicon, the Annals of Fulda, and Liutprand of Cremona's Antapodosis ("Retribution"), provide contemporaneous or near-contemporaneous information of the 9th-century Magyars. There are also references to the Magyars dwelling in the Pontic steppes in the legends of Cyril, Methodius and other early Slavic saints. According to historian András Róna-Tas, information preserved in the Russian Primary Chronicle, which was completed in the 1110s, has to be "treated with extreme caution".

The first Hungarian chronicles were written in the late 11th or early  but their texts were preserved in manuscripts compiled in the 13th to 15th centuries. Most extant chronicles show that the earliest works contained no information on the history of the Hungarians before their conversion to Christianity in the 11th century. The only exception is the Gesta Hungarorum, which is the earliest extant Hungarian chronicle, whose principal subject is the Magyars' pagan past. However, the reliability of this work, which was written by a former royal notary now known as Anonymus, is suspect. In his monograph of medieval Hungarian historians, Carlile Aylmer Macartney describes it as "the most famous, the most obscure, the most exasperating and most misleading of all the early Hungarian texts".

Historiography

Medieval theories 

According to the Annals of St. Bertin, the Magyars who invaded East Francia in 862 were enemies "hitherto unknown" to the local population. Likewise, Regino of Prüm wrote that the Magyars had been "unheard of in the previous centuries because they were not named". in the sources. Both remarks evince that late 9th-century authors had no knowledge of the Magyars' origins. However, the Magyar raids reminded the Western European and Byzantine scholars of earlier historians' descriptions of the Scythians or Huns, which gave rise to their identification with those peoples. For instance, Leo the Wise listed the Hungarians among the "Scythian nations". The similarity between the Latin ethnonyms Huni and Hungari strengthened the identification of the two peoples, which became commonplace in Western Europe in the 11th century. The Chronicon Eberspergense was the first source that clearly stated that the Huns and the Hungarians were the same people.

The earliest Hungarian chronicles adopted the idea that the Huns and Hungarians were closely related. Anonymus did not mention the Huns, but he referred to Attila the Hun as a ruler "from whose line Prince Álmos", the supreme head of the Magyar tribes, descended. However, Simon of Kéza explicitly identified the Huns and the Hungarians in the 1280. He started his chronicle with a book of the history of the Huns, thus presenting the Hungarian conquest of the Carpathian Basin as the reoccupation of a land inherited from their ancestors. Thereafter the identification of the two peoples was the basic theory of the origins of the Hungarians for centuries.

Legend of the Wondrous Hind 

Most historians agree that the legend of the wondrous hind preserved the Hungarians' own myth of their origins. The late 13th-century chronicler Simon of Kéza was the first to record it. The legend says two brothers, Hunor and Magor, were the forefathers of the Huns and Hungarians. They were the sons of Ménrót and his wife, Eneth. While chasing a hind, they reached as far as the marches of the Sea of Azov, where they abducted the wives of Belar's sons and two daughters of Dula, the prince of the Alans. According to historian Gyula Kristó, Eneth's name derived from the Hungarian word for hind (ünő), showing that the Magyars regarded this animal as their totemistic ancestor. Kristó also says the four personal names mentioned in the legend personify four peoples: the Hungarians (Magor), the Onogurs (Hunor), the Bulgars (Belar) and the Dulakindred of the Alans or Bulgars (Dulo). The hunt for a beast, ending with the arrival in a new homeland, was a popular legend among the peoples of the Eurasian steppes, including the Huns and the Mansi. The myth that a people were descended from two brothers was also widespread. Consequently, it is possible that Simon of Kéza did not record a genuine Hungarian legend, but borrowed it from foreign sources.

Modern scholarship 

Scholarly attempts in the early 18th century to prove a relationship between the Finns and the Huns led to the realization of the similarities between the Finnish and Hungarian languages. János Sajnovics's Demonstratio, the first systematic comparative study of Hungarian and the Saami languages, was published in 1770. Three decades later, Sámuel Gyarmathi demonstrated similarities between a larger group of languages that are now known as Uralic languages. However, the majority of Hungarian scholars only gradually adopted Sajnovics's and Gyarmathi's views. In the 1830s, Pál Hunfalvy still wrote that Hungarian had an intermediate position between the Finnish and Turkic languages, but later accepted that Hungarian is closely related to the Mansi and Khanty languages. Hereafter linguistics played a pre-eminent role in the research of the Magyars' prehistory because it was always the dominant linguistic theory that determined the interpretation of historical and archaeological evidence. Historian László Kontler identifies "the history of Hungarian origins" as "the history of a community whose genetic composition and cultural character has been changing, but which has assuredly spoken Hungarian or its predecessor language".

According to mainstream scholarly consensus, the Hungarians are not the autochthonous population of the Carpathian Basin. Their ancestors arrived there through a series of westward migrations across the Eurasian steppes around 894, centuries after their departure from their original homeland located somewhere in the East. Many details of the Magyars' prehistorythe location of their original homeland, the ancient Magyars' connections with the Turkic peoples and the Khazar Khaganate, their lifestyle and political organization, and the background of their conquest of the Carpathian Basinare still subject to scholarly debates. With regard to the connections between the Magyars and the Turkic tribes, archaeologist Gyula László mooted an alternative theory in the 1960s. According to his theory of the "double conquest", a large group of people who spoke a Finno-Ugrian language arrived in the Carpathian Basin in 670, and a Turkic-speaking people conquered the same territory in the late 9th century. László's theory has never been widely accepted.

Way of life

Economy 

Most Neolithic settlements were situated on the banks of rivers and lakes in the proposed original homeland of the Uralic peoples, but no houses have been excavated there. The local inhabitants primarily used tools made of stoneespecially jasper from the southern Urals, bone and wood, but baked clay vessels decorated with broken or wavy lines were also found. Their economy was based on fishing, hunting, and gathering. The basic Hungarian words connected to these activitiesháló (net), íj (bow), nyíl (arrow), ideg (bowstring), and mony (egg)are inherited from the Proto-Uralic period. The Hungarian words for house (ház), dwelling (lak), door (ajtó), and bed (ágy) are of Proto-Finno-Ugric origin. Houses built in the presumed Finno-Ugric homeland in the wider region of the Urals in the  show regional differences; in the valley of the Sosva River, square pit-houses were dug deep into the ground; along the Kama River, rectangular semi-pit houses were built. The local people were hunter-gatherers. They used egg-shaped, baked clay vessels that were decorated with rhombuses, triangles, and other geometrical forms. They buried their dead in shallow graves and showered the bodies with red ochre. They also placed objects including tools, jewels made of pierced boar tusks, and small pendants in the form of animal heads into the graves. Words from the Proto-Ugric periodló ("horse"), nyereg ("saddle"), fék ("bridle"), and szekér ("wagon")show that those who spoke this language rode horses. The bones of domestic animalscattle, goats, sheep, pigs, and horsescomprised 90% of all animal bones excavated in many settlements. Loan words from Proto-Iranian suggest the Ugric-speaking populations adopted animal husbandry from neighboring peoples. For instance, the Hungarian words for cow (tehén) and milk (tej) are of Proto-Iranian origin. Archaeological findsincluding seeds of millet, wheat, and barley, and tools including sickles, hoes, and spade handlesprove the local population also cultivated arable lands.

Ethnographic studies of modern nomadic populations suggest cyclic migrationsa year-by-year movement between their winter and summer campsfeatured in their way of life, but they also cultivated arable lands around their winter camps. Most historians agree the Magyars had a mixed nomadic or semi-nomadic economy, characterized by both the raising of cattle and the cultivation of arable lands. For instance, the Hungarian words for hen (tyúk), pig (disznó), castrated hog (ártány), bull (bika), ox (ökör), calf (borjú), steer (tinó), female cow (ünő), goat (kecske), camel (teve), ram (kos), buttermilk (író), shepherd's cloak (köpönyeg), badger (borz), fruit (gyümölcs), apple (alma), pear (körte), grape (szőlő), dogwood (som), sloe (kökény), wheat (búza), barley (árpa), pea (borsó), hemp (kender), pepper (borz), nettle (csalán), garden (kert), plough (eke), ax (balta), scutcher (tiló), oakum (csepű), weed (gyom), refuse of grain (ocsú), fallow land (tarló), and sickle (sarló) are of Turkic origin. Most loanwords were borrowed from Bulgar or other Chuvash-type Turkic language, but the place and the time of the borrowings are uncertain. The Magyars' connections with the people of the Saltovo-Mayaki culture may have contributed to the development of their agriculture, according to Spinei.

According to Ibn Rusta, the late 9th-century Magyars "dwell in tents and move from place to place in search of pasturage", but during the winters they settled along the nearest river, where they lived by fishing. He also said their "land is well watered and harvests abundant", showing they had arable lands, although it is unclear whether those lands were cultivated by the Magyars themselves or by their prisoners. Taxes collected from the neighboring peoples, a slave trade, and plundering raids made the Magyars a wealthy people. Gardezi wrote that they were "a handsome people and of good appearance and their clothes are of silk brocade and their weapons are of silver and are encrusted with pearls", proving their growing wealth. However, 9th-century Byzantine and Muslim coins have rarely been found in the Pontic steppes.

Archaeological finds from the Carpathian Basin provide evidence of the crafts practiced by the Magyars. 10th-century warriors' graves yielding sabres, arrow-heads, spear-heads, stirrups, and snaffle bits made of iron show that blacksmiths had a pre-eminent role in the militarized Magyar society. Engraved or gilded sabres and sabretache platesoften decorated with precious stonesand golden or silver pectoral disks evidence the high levels of skills of Magyar gold- and silversmiths. Cemeteries in the Carpathian Basin also yielded scraps of canvas made of flax or hemp. The positioning of metal buttons in the graves shows the Magyars wore clothes that either opened down the front or were fastened at the neck. Ear-rings were the only accessories worn above the belt by Magyar warriors; jewelry on their upper bodies would have hindered them from firing arrows. In contrast, Magyar women wore head jewelry decorated with leaf-like pendants, ear-rings, decorated pectoral disks, and rings with gemstones.

A man seeking a bride was expected to pay a bride price to her father before the marriage took place, according to Gardizi's description of the late 9th-century Magyars. The Hungarian word for bridegroomvőlegény from vevő legény ("purchasing lad") and the expression eladó lány (verbatim, "bride for sale") confirm the reliability of the Muslim author's report. A decree of Stephen I of Hungary prohibiting the abduction of a girl without her parents' consent implies that pretended abduction of the bride by her future husband was an integral part of ancient Magyar matrimonial ceremonies.

Military 
The Magyars' military tactics were similar to those of the Huns, Avars, Pechenegs, Mongols, and other nomadic peoples. According to Emperor Leo the Wise, the main components of Magyar warfare were long-distance arrow-fire, surprise attack, and feigned retreat. However, the contemporaneous Regino of Prüm said the Magyars knew "nothing  taking besieged cities". Archaeological research confirms Leo the Wise's report of the use of sabres, bows, and arrows. However, in contrast with the emperor's report, spears have rarely been found in Magyar warriors' tombs. Their most important weapons were bone-reinforced reflex bows, with which they could shoot at a specific target within .

Religion 

Modern scholarly theories of the Magyars' pagan religious beliefs and practices are primarily based on reports by biased medieval authors and prohibitions enacted during the reigns of Christian kings. Both Christian and Muslim sources say the Magyars worshipped forces of nature. They gave offering to trees, fountains, and stones, and made sacrifices at wells; these are evidenced by the prohibition of such practices during the reign of Ladislaus I of Hungary in the late . In accordance with the custom of the peoples of the Eurasian steppes, the pagan Magyars swore oaths on dogs, which were bisected to warn potential oathbrakers of their fate. Simon of Kéza also wrote about the sacrifice of horses. According to the Gesta Hungarorum, the seven Magyar chiefs confirmed their treaty "in pagan manner with their own blood spilled in a single vessel".

Scholars studying the Magyars' religion also take into account ethnographic analogies, folklore, linguistic evidence, and archaeological research. Artifacts depicting a bird of prey or a tree of life imply both symbols were important elements of the Magyar religion. Trepanationthe real or symbolic wounding of the craniumwas widely practiced by 10th-century Magyars. Gyula László writes that real trepanationsthe opening of the skull with a chiesel and the closing of the wound with a sheet of silverwere actually surgical operations similarly to those already practiced by Arab physicians, whereas symbolic trepanationsthe marking of the skull with an incised circlewere aimed at the disposal of a protective talisman on the head. According to Róna-Tas, a Hungarian word for cunning, (agyafúrt)verbatim "with a drilled brain"may reflect these ancient practices.

The Magyars buried their dead, laying the deceased on their backs with the arms resting along their bodies or upon their pelvises. A deceased warrior's tomb always contained material connected with his horse. These are most frequently its skin, skull, and the lower legs; these were put into its master's grave, but occasionally only the harness was buried together with the warrior, or the horse's skin was stuffed with hay. The Magyars rolled the corpses in textiles or mats and placed silver plates on the eyes and the mouth.

Scholarly theories note the similarities between the táltos of Hungarian folklore and Siberian shamans, but the existence of shamans among the ancient Magyars cannot be proven. Many elements of the Hungarian religious vocabulary, including boszorkány ("witch"), elbűvöl ("to charm"), and the ancient Hungarian word for holy (igy or egy), are of Turkic origin. Many of these loanwords were adopted into their Christian vocabulary: búcsú (indulgence), bűn (sin), gyón (confess), isten (god), and ördög (devil). According to Gyula László, a Hungarian children's verse that refers to a fife, a drum, and a reed violin preserves the memory of a pagan ritual for expelling harmful spirits by raising great noise. The refrain of another children's verse, which mentions three days of the week in reverse order, may have preserved an ancient belief in the existence of an afterlife world where everything is upside-down.

See also

Arvisura
 Hungarian mythology
 Hunor and Magor
 List of Hungarian rulers
 Magyar tribes
 Old Hungarian alphabet
 Origin of the Székelys
 Principality of Hungary
 Shamanistic remnants in Hungarian folklore
 Turul

Notes

Sources

Primary sources

 Anonymus, Notary of King Béla: The Deeds of the Hungarians (Edited, Translated and Annotated by Martyn Rady and László Veszprémy) (2010). In: Rady, Martyn; Veszprémy, László; Bak, János M. (2010); Anonymus and Master Roger; CEU Press; .
 Constantine Porphyrogenitus: De Administrando Imperio (Greek text edited by Gyula Moravcsik, English translation by Romillyi J. H. Jenkins) (1967). Dumbarton Oaks Center for Byzantine Studies. .
 "Ibn Rusta on the Magyars 903–913" (2012). In: Ibn Fadlān: Ibn Fadlān on the Land of Darkness: Arab Travellers in the Far North (Translated with an Introduction by Paul Lunde and Caroline Stone) (2012) ; Penguin Books; .
 Simon of Kéza: The Deeds of the Hungarians (Edited and translated by László Veszprémy and Frank Schaer with a study by Jenő Szűcs) (1999). CEU Press. .
 The Annals of Fulda (Ninth-Century Histories, Volume II) (Translated and annotated by Timothy Reuter) (1992). Manchester University Press. .
 The Annals of St-Bertin (Ninth-Century Histories, Volume I) (Translated and annotated by Janet L. Nelson) (1991). Manchester University Press. .
 "The Chronicle of Regino of Prüm" (2009). In: History and Politics in Late Carolingian and Ottonian Europe: The Chronicle of Regino of Prüm and Adalbert of Magdeburg (Translated and annotated by Simon MacLean); Manchester University Press; .
 The Hungarian Illuminated Chronicle: Chronica de Gestis Hungarorum (Edited by Dezső Dercsényi) (1970). Corvina, Taplinger Publishing. .
 The Taktika of Leo VI (Text, translation, and commentary by George T. Dennis) (2010). Dumbarton Oaks. .
 "The Life of Constantine"; "The Life of Methodius" (1983). In: Kantor, Marvin (1983); Medieval Slavic Lives of Saints and Princes; pp. 23–161. University of Michigan; .

Secondary sources

Further reading

External links

 

 
01
Pastoralists
Nomadic groups in Eurasia
History of Ural
Saltovo-Mayaki culture